Singapore competed at the 1992 Summer Olympics in Barcelona, Spain. 14 competitors, 11 men and 3 women, took part in 26 events in 6 sports.

Competitors
The following is the list of number of competitors in the Games.

Badminton

Women's Competition
 Zarinah Abdullah 
Men's Competition
 Hamid Khan
 Donald Koh

Fencing

Two male fencers represented Singapore in 1992.

Men's foil
 Wong Liang Hun
 Tan Kim Huat

Men's épée
 Wong Liang Hun
 Tan Kim Huat

Judo

Men's Competition
 Ho Yen Chye

Sailing

 Chan Joseph
 Siew Shaw Her

Shooting

 Chng Seng Mok

Swimming

Men's 50m Freestyle
 Kenneth Yeo
 Heat — 25.29 (→ did not advance, 56th place)

Men's 100m Freestyle
 Kenneth Yeo
 Heat — 54.44 (→ did not advance, 56th place)

Men's 200m Freestyle
 Kenneth Yeo
 Heat — 1:57.80 (→ did not advance, 39th place)

Men's 400m Freestyle
 Kenneth Yeo
 Heat — 4:13.45 (→ did not advance, 43rd place)

Men's 200m Backstroke
 Tan V Meng
 Heat — 2:11.36 (→ did not advance, 38th place)

Men's 200m Breaststroke
 Desmond Koh
 Heat — 2:21.87 (→ did not advance, 32nd place)

Men's 100m Butterfly
 Tan V Meng
 Heat — 58.21 (→ did not advance, 51st place)

Men's 200m Butterfly
 Tan V Meng
 Heat — 2:06.41 (→ did not advance, 37th place)

Men's 200m Individual Medley
 Desmond Koh
 Heat — 2:07.16 (→ did not advance, 31st place)

 Tan V Meng
 Heat — 2:11.14 (→ did not advance, 40th place)

Men's 400m Individual Medley
 Desmond Koh
 Heat — 4:28.95 (→ did not advance, 21st place)

Women's 50m Freestyle
 Joscelin Yeo
 Heat — 27.36 (→ did not advance, 34th place)

 May Ooi Yu-fen
 Heat — 28.77 (→ did not advance, 46th place)

Women's 100m Freestyle
 Joscelin Yeo
 Heat — 58.93 (→ did not advance, 33rd place)

Women's 200m Freestyle
 Joscelin Yeo
 Heat — 2:07.09 (→ did not advance, 28th place)

 May Ooi Yu-fen
 Heat — 2:13.20 (→ did not advance, 36th place)

Women's 400m Freestyle
 Joscelin Yeo
 Heat — 4:29.76 (→ did not advance, 28th place)

 May Ooi Yu-fen
 Heat — 4:37.77 (→ did not advance, 32nd place)

Women's 100m Butterfly
 Joscelin Yeo
 Heat — 1:03.82 (→ did not advance, 31st place)

 May Ooi Yu-fen
 Heat — 1:04.14 (→ did not advance, 34th place)

Women's 200m Butterfly
 May Ooi Yu-fen
 Heat — 2:26.97 (→ did not advance, 32nd place)

Women's 200m Individual Medley
 Joscelin Yeo
 Heat — 2:25.32 (→ did not advance, 33rd place)

 May Ooi Yu-fen
 Heat — 2:27.62 (→ did not advance, 36th place)

Women's 400m Individual Medley
 May Ooi Yu-fen
 Heat — 5:08.19 (→ did not advance, 30th place)

References

External links
Official Olympic Reports

Nations at the 1992 Summer Olympics
1992
1992 in Singaporean sport